Tomka railway station is a railway station on the East Coast Railway network in the state of Odisha, India. It serves Tomka village. Its code is TMKA. It has one platforms. Passenger, MEMU, Express trains halt at Tomka railway station.

Major trains
 Puri–Barbil Express

See also
 Jajpur district

References

Railway stations in Jajpur district
Khurda Road railway division